The Old Town of Bratislava is the historic center and one of the boroughs of Bratislava, in the Bratislava Region of Slovakia. It is coextensive with the smallest Slovak administrative district by area, Bratislava I. It contains the small, but preserved medieval city center, Bratislava Castle and other important landmarks. Bratislava's Old Town is known for its many churches, the Bratislava Riverfront and cultural institutions, it is also the location of most of the foreign states embassies and important Slovak institutions including the National Council of the Slovak Republic; the Summer Archbishop's Palace, seat of the Government of Slovakia; and Grassalkovich Palace, seat of the President of Slovakia.

Location 
The Old Town is bordered by the river Danube to the west, Karlova Ves to the north, the New Town to the north and east, and Ružinov to the east and south.

Division 

The Old Town is divided into several local parts: the historical center, Vydrica, Zukermandel, Blumentál, and others. Some of the local parts were demolished by the Communist government after World War II, including Vydrica and Zukermandel.

Characteristics 
As its name suggests, the district houses many historic monuments and Bratislava's central institutions. It also contains many Slovak governmental offices and institutions, such as the Ministry of Interior, the Ministry of Culture, and the Ministry of Justice.

The western part of the district is a hilly area (technically part of the Small Carpathians mountain range) featuring Bratislava Castle, the Slavín monument, Horský park (literally Mountain(ous) Park), many detached houses, and most of the foreign embassies in Slovakia. The hilly area ends in the south at the Danube with the Chatam Sofer Memorial and the Bratislava Castle hill, and in the west at the D2 Motorway. This part of Bratislava is more quiet than the other parts of the city's Old Town and, apart from the castle, it is seldom visited by tourists.

The eastern section is the historical and administrative center. Notable buildings and spaces include the Grassalkovich Palace, Trinity Church, Bratislava's Town Hall, St. Martin's Cathedral, Michael's Gate, the Primate's Palace, Comenius University, the main railway station (Hlavná stanica), the Slovak National Theatre (both the old and new sites), SNP Square, the Main Square (Hlavné námestie), Hviezdoslav Square (Hviezdoslavovo námestie), Kamenné námestie ('Stone Square'), Obchodná ulica ('Shop Street' equivalent to  High Street), Pharmacy Salvator, Zochova Street from the 14th century and many other old churches and palaces. There are still some remnants of the medieval Bratislava city walls, although not open to the public for the time being.

Demographics
According to the 2021 census, 80% of inhabitants of the Old Town were Slovaks, 2% Hungarians, 1% Czechs and remaining 17% belonged to other nationalities, including those, who did not indicate their nationality. 33% of inhabitants indicated belonging to the Roman Catholic Church, 5% to Evangelical Church of the Augsburg Confession in Slovakia, 1% to the Slovak Greek Catholic Church. The plurality 43% indicated not belonging to any religion.

Mayors 
 1990–1994 – Miloslava Zemková (DS)
 1994–1998 – Andrej Ďurkovský (KDH)
 1998–2002 – Andrej Ďurkovský (KDH)
 2002–2006 – Peter Čiernik (KDH)
 2006–2010 – Andrej Petrek (independent, later SDKÚ-DS, expelled in 2008)
 2010–2014 – Tatiana Rosová (SDKÚ-DS)
 2014–2018 – Radoslav Števčík (independent)
 2018–2022 – Zuzana Aufrichtová
 2022–2026 – Matej Vagač (coalition Progressive Slovakia | Team Bratislava)

Twin town 
  Obrenovac, Serbia

See also 
Personalities
 Ignác Lamár

Tourism
 Eurovea
 River Park
 Public restrooms in Bratislava
 List of fountains in Bratislava

Other
 Old Town, Košice - An analogous borough in Slovakia's second largest city, Košice.

References

External links

Gallery 

 
Boroughs of Bratislava
Tourist attractions in Bratislava